Entodon seductrix, known as the seductive entodon moss, is a species of Entodontaceae.

References

Flora of Michigan
Hypnales
Flora without expected TNC conservation status